Deh-e Ali Morad or Deh Ali Morad, also rendered as Deh Ali Murad, may refer to:
 Deh-e Ali Morad, Markazi
 Deh-e Ali Morad, Sistan and Baluchestan